Yoann Beaka (born 6 April 2003) is a French professional footballer who plays for Troyes II.

Club career 
Yoann Beaka joined the Stade de Reims academy in 2017, from an amateur club of Trilport, after spending two years in the federal  of Reims.

Having joined Paris FC under-19s during the 2021–22 season, Beaka was promoted to the reserve team in National 3 in 2022, where he quickly impressed with his attacking skills, scoring a hat-trick during a 6–2 win over FCM Aubervilliers.

Called to the first team in February 2022, he made his professional debut for Paris FC on the 5 March 2022, replacing Julien Lopez on the 73rd minute of a 1–1 away Ligue 2 draw to Nîmes.

Personal life
Born in France, Beaka is of Ivorian descent.

References

External links

2003 births
Living people
Footballers from Paris
French footballers
French sportspeople of Ivorian descent
Association football forwards
Paris FC players
Ligue 2 players
Championnat National 3 players